Ali Nayip Zade was a Cretan Muslim who served in high administrative posts in Greece.

Biography
A personal friend of the Liberal Cretan politician and Prime Minister of Greece Eleftherios Venizelos, Nayip Zade was appointed by him as the first Prefect of Drama and Kavala in 1913. During Greece's expansion in the wake of the Balkan Wars and after World War I Venizelos, anxious to secure the acquiescence to Greek rule the goodwill of the large Muslim populations of Macedonia and Thrace, often appointed Cretan Muslims he knew and trusted to senior administrative posts in areas with a heavy Muslim presence. In 1919, Nayip Zade occupied a senior post in the administration of the Smyrna Zone, before being appointed Prefect of Adrianople, and subsequently Prefect of Lasithi in Crete, a post he kept until the compulsory Greco-Turkish population exchange of 1923.

References

Sources
 

20th-century Greek people
Cretan Turks
Prefects of Greece
History of Greece (1909–1924)
People from Crete